MidOcean Partners is a New York-based alternative asset management firm that specializes in mid-sized private equity and alternative leveraged investments.

The firm, founded in February 2003, is based in Midtown Manhattan. MidOcean was originally formed by the managers of DB Capital Partners to acquire Deutsche Bank's late stage private equity investments in the United States and Europe in one of the largest private equity secondary transactions completed to date.

History
MidOcean Partners was formed through a management spinout transaction. A group of investors provided capital to the managers of DB Capital Partners, led by MidOcean CEO Ted Virtue, to acquire the portfolio of private equity investments they had managed at Deutsche Bank. Among the investors in the transaction were NIB Capital Private Equity (today AlpInvest Partners), HarbourVest Partners, Paul Capital Partners, Coller Capital, Ontario Teachers' Pension Plan and CPP Investment Board, with investments from Northwestern Mutual, The Yucaipa Companies and Presidential Life. The management spinout of MidOcean, at the time valued at €1.5 billion (over $1.8 billion) was then and is still one of the largest transactions completed in the private equity secondary market.

In June 2022, MidOcean Partners acquired Pragmatic Institute, a product management training company.

The spinout of MidOcean came at the same time as the spinouts of private equity groups from other leading investment banks including: JPMorgan Chase (CCMP Capital), Citigroup (Court Square Capital Partners), Morgan Stanley (Metalmark Capital) and Credit Suisse First Boston (Avista Capital Partners, Diamond Castle Holdings).

Investments
Among MidOcean's investments are various business services; consumer and leisure companies, media and niche industrial services companies including:
 Music Reports
 Casablanca Fan Company
 Center Parcs UK
 Hunter Fan Company
 Jostens
 LA Fitness (Europe) —unaffiliated with American LA Fitness company
 Palace Entertainment
 Prestige Brands
 Sbarro
 Stratus Technologies
 Totes-Isotoner
 United Biscuits
 Young America Corporation
 KidKraft 
 LegalShield (previously known as Pre-Paid Legal)
 Travelpro Products, Inc
 Questex, a "leading B2B information services provider", acquired from Shamrock Capital in 2018 for a price estimated at around $180 million; Questex holdings include:

 FierceMarkets Inc., a Washington, DC based electronic media company focused on online and e-mail newsletter trade publishing covering various industries. Fierce-branded properties include FierceBiotech, FierceCable, FierceCEO, FierceHealthcare, FiercePharma, FierceRetail, FierceTelecom, and FierceWireless.
 Marketplaces, including Beauty, Spa & Wellness, Hospitality, Life Sciences & Healthcare, Telecommunications & Technology and Travel

Former investments
 Bushnell Corporation, sold in 2013 to Alliant Techsystems/ATK
Jenny Craig, Inc.
Water Pik, Inc. (agreed to sell: 2017)

Leadership 

 Ted Virtue – CEO
 Steve Shenfeld – President
 Deborah Hodges – COO & Managing Director
 Andrew Spring – CFO & Managing Director

Source:

References

"Former Deutsche Buyout Arm Raised $1 billion for New Fund." New York Times, July 19, 2006
"MidOcean Partners to Raise $1 billion fund", eFinancial News, January 9, 2006
"Goldman Sachs, CPPIB Lead $925M Secondary Buy."Buyouts, April 17, 2006
"MidOcean Partners Announces Acquisition of Travelpro Group Luggage Industry Leader", PR Newswire, May 23, 2016
Secondaries grow in stature

External links

MidOcean Partners (company website)

Private equity firms of the United States
Private equity secondary market
Investment banking private equity groups
Financial services companies established in 2003
DB Group
Companies based in Manhattan
Hedge fund firms in New York City
2003 establishments in New York City